George Pantazi (18 April 1893 – 3 June 1958), better known by his stage name Georges Boulanger, was a Romanian violinist, conductor and composer.

Biography 
Georges Boulanger was born in Tulcea, Romania, from a Romani (Gypsy) family with a very long tradition in music. His father was Vasile Pantazi, nicknamed "Boulanger". He was known as one of the typical Romanian virtuosi. He learned to play the violin as a child from his father, who was already the sixth generation musician. At the age of 12, Georges Boulanger got a scholarship to study at the Conservatory in Bucharest. Three years later he was heard by Leopold Auer who took him to Dresden with him and where he studied with him for the next two years. Other students of Auer included Jascha Heifetz, Nathan Milstein, and Mischa Elman.

In 1910, when Boulanger was 17 years old, Leopold Auer told him that his musical studies were finished and gave him a violin as a going away present. Boulanger played on this violin until his death. Under the recommendation of Auer, Georges Boulanger received a position of first violinist in the Café Chantant in Saint Petersburg, Russia. This was where many aristocrats frequented. With his "background music", a mixture of Romani music, Balkan folklore and Viennese waltzes he found that many people in the public enjoyed his taste in music. This music is also known as salon music.

It was here in Russia that Georges Boulanger met a young girl from Estonia named Ellionorr Paulson. She was an intellectual student of law and medicine. They eventually got married and had two daughters, Nora and Georgette.

In 1917 Georges Boulanger left Russia and returned to Romania. In 1922/23 he went to Berlin where he played for his old audiences of Russian Aristocrats that now lived in Berlin. In the year 1926, his name suddenly became well-known. Boulanger played in radio transmissions that were broadcast live throughout the country. He played in the most famous houses in Berlin and other large European cities such as the Savoy Hotel in London. He was signed by the Bote & Bock Edition who published his musical compositions.

The melody of his popular 1926 song Avant de mourir became a popular standard with the addition in 1939 of lyrics by  Carlos Gomez Barrera and Jimmy Kennedy, retitled "My Prayer". In 1956 the recording of "My Prayer" by US R&B-pop act The Platters spent 23 weeks on [[Billboard Hot 100|Billboard'''s Hot 100]], five of them at number one. Billboard ranked the single as the fourth biggest of the year.

Boulanger lived in Germany from the early 1920s until 1948 when he moved to South America. He worked in Brazil then settled in Argentina for the rest of his days. He died in Olivos, Buenos Aires.

 Compositions 
Boulanger wrote about 250 compositions. Most of his works last 5 or 6 minutes.

Afrika
Auf der Hochzeitreise
Autumn Moods
Avant de mourir (later known as "My Prayer")
Beside the Lake
Budapest Party
Buntes Allerlei
Comme ci, comme ça
Da Capo
Danse Hongroise
Der Dudelsackpfeifer (for solo violin)
Der Lustige Schotte
Die Glasharfe
Die lustige Puppe (The Happy Doll)
Die Zigeunerin
Einsam steh ich unterm Sternenzelt
Familien-Polka
Flageolett Walzer No. 1 in G major (G.Boulanger)
Flageolett Walzer No. 2 in G major
Für Dich
Gemuse! Gemuse! Gemuse!
Georgette
Zigeunerständchen (Gypsy serenade)
Gruss an Franz Liszt
Hallo! Budapest
Heimweh (Homesickness)
Herbstgedanken
Hora – Rumänischer Tanz in A major
Kinderparade
Krach-Czárdás
La Trioletta
Liebling der Frauen – Walz
Max und Moritz
Mein Herz
Norinka – Serenade
Orientalische Nacht
The Piper
Pizzicato-Waltz in E major
Puszta-Marchen
Quand je suis content
Ratata-Bum
Schlaf Georgette
Schmetterlingsspiel
Serenade in E minor
Tango Nora
Tango Torero
Teddy-Bear
Tokay
Vitamin-Polka
Winke, winke
Zufriedenheit (Träumerischer Walzer)

 As an actor 

Films Georges Boulanger appears in:

 Der ewige Klang (1943) ... with his ensemble
 a.k.a.  (France)
 a.k.a. Der Geiger (The Violinist)
 a.k.a. The Eternal Tone (UK)Immer nur ... Du (1941) ... Violinist
 a.k.a. Man müsste Klavier spielen können (Germany) (One must be able to play the piano)
 a.k.a. You Only You (International: English title)Die ganz großen Torheiten (1937) ... ViolinistDas Mädchen Irene (1936) ... Violinist
 a.k.a. The Girl Irene (USA)Punks kommt aus Amerika (1935) ... Violinist
 a.k.a. Punks Arrives from America (USA)Die Geige lockt (1935) (1932) ... President
 a.k.a. Hallo hallo! Hier spricht Berlin! (Germany)
 a.k.a. Here's Berlin (International: English title)
 The Mad Bomberg (1932) ... Well-known Violinist
 a.k.a. Der tolle Bomberg''

External links 

 
 Georges Boulanger at Discogs

 Web site of Georges Boulanger
 The home page of Prima Carezza , a Swiss Salon music ensemble specializing in music by Boulanger.

1893 births
1958 deaths
Romanian conductors (music)
Male conductors (music)
Romanian violinists
Male violinists
Romani violinists
Romanian Romani people
20th-century conductors (music)
20th-century violinists
People from Tulcea
20th-century male musicians
Romanian expatriates in Germany
Romanian expatriates in Brazil
Romanian emigrants to Argentina